Papyrus Oxyrhynchus III 466 (P. Oxy. III,466) is a fragmentary 2nd century  Greek papyrus manuscript  containing instructions for wrestling, including the description of various grips and holds, constituting the earliest historical European martial arts manual along with P.Oxy LXXIX 5204 (instructions for pankration). The papyrus was given to Columbia University by the Egypt Exploration Society in 1907.

The text is in three columns with 13, 15 and 10 lines, respectively.
Each instruction is followed by plexon (πλέξον) "tangle", translated  by Miller (2004) as "mix it up!" (in the sense of "execute!"). Poliakoff (1987) translates "you fight it out".

See also
 Oxyrhynchus Papyri
 Greek wrestling

References

B. P. Grenfell & A. S. Hunt,  Oxyrhynchus Papyri III, 401 (1903), pp. 137–139.
 	 APIS record: columbia.apis.p356
 Stephen G. Miller, Arete: Greek Sports from Ancient Sources University of California Press (2004), p. 32 
Michael B. Poliakoff,  Combat Sports in the Ancient World: Competition, Violence, and Culture Sports and History Series, Yale University Press (1987), p. 51f.

2nd-century manuscripts
466
Wrestling
Historical European martial arts
Martial arts manuals